Hickory Beach, Ontario may refer to:

Hickory Beach, Kawartha Lakes, Ontario
Hickory Beach, Haldimand County, Ontario